Samson The Nazarite is a novel by Ze'ev Jabotinsky centered on the Biblical epic of Samson. In 1926, it was first published as a serial in the Russian Zionist journal Razsvet and then published in book form in 1927. In 1930, the book was first translated into English. The book served as the basis for Cecil B. DeMille's 1949 film Samson and Delilah.

Publication history
In 1930, Samson was first published by Horace Liveright in English as Judge and Fool. Martin Secker published it under the title Samson the Nazarite, also in 1930, from the Cyrus Brooks translation of the book from German. Bernard Ackerman, Inc. republished the book in English in 1945 under the title Prelude to Delilah.

References

Novels first published in serial form
1927 novels
Russian novels adapted into films
Zionism in Russia
Ze'ev Jabotinsky
Cultural depictions of Samson